The 2011 Ventforet Kofu season was Ventforet Kofu's first season in J. League Division 1 since 2007, making it the third overall in J1. Ventforet finished 15th and were relegated to Division 2. Ventforet got knocked out in the first round of the 2011 J. League Cup and third round of the 2011 Emperor's Cup.

Players

Competitions

J. League

League table

Matches

Results by round

J. League Cup

Emperor's Cup

References

Ventforet Kofu
Ventforet Kofu seasons